Chapman's Regiment of Militia, also known as Chapman's Regiment of Foot, was first organized in 1775 after the Lexington Alarm had reached Connecticut. Commanded by James Chapman of New London, the regiment included men from New London, Lyme and Groton, Connecticut. One company is known to have fought at Bunker Hill in 1775 and New York in 1776.

Chapman's Regiment were well equipped, well trained troops. Eventually James Chapman would serve in Knowlton's Rangers, the Continental Army's first elite troops.

References 

Connecticut militia
Military in Connecticut